John Appleby may refer to:

John Appleby (inventor) (1840–1917), American inventor of knotting device to bind grain bundles with twine
John Appleby (author), 20th-century American author of pulp novels including Conquered City
Sir John Appleby, detective created by Michael Innes in the 1930s who appeared in many novels and short stories
John Appleby (economist), Chief economist, The Nuffield Trust

See also
Appleby (disambiguation)